Katinka Barysch is a German economist and financial commentator.

Early life
She gained a BA in Political Science, Economics and Law from Ludwig Maximilian University of Munich in Munich. She attended the London School of Economics (LSE), where she gained an MSc in International Political Economy.

Career

The Economist
From 1997-2001 she worked at the Economist Intelligence Unit, becoming Editor.

Centre for European Reform
She worked at the Centre for European Reform (CER) from 2001, as Chief Economist then becoming Deputy Director.

She has been part of the Young Global Leaders. She has worked with the Official Monetary and Financial Institutions Forum (OMFIF). She has been twice nominated for prizes from the Society of Business Economists.

Publications
 New Designs for Europe, 2002, CER,

See also
 List of Young Global Leaders
 :Category:Germany and the European Union

References

External links
 Start the Week November 2012
 World Economic Forum
 Global Security

Alumni of the London School of Economics
German economists
German financial commentators
Ludwig Maximilian University of Munich alumni
The Economist people
Living people
Year of birth missing (living people)